Hindhede Nature Park is a park located next to Bukit Timah Nature Reserve in Singapore.

Background
Opened in 2001, it is designed for families with young children.

A short trail leads into the park starting from the Bukit Timah Visitor Centre and looping to the Hindhede Quarry 90 metres away. Animals that can be found in the park include the Banded Woodpecker, Clouded Monitor Lizard, Greater Racket-tailed Drongo and Plaintain Squirrel.

References

External links
Hindhede Nature Park at National Parks Board

2001 establishments in Singapore
Parks in Singapore